Whyte may refer to:

Whyte (surname), a family name
Whyte, West Virginia
Whyte Chemicals, a manufacturer and distributor
Whyte notation for steam locomotives

See also
 
White (disambiguation)
Wight (disambiguation)

ru:Уайт